Chondrothyra is a genus of land snails with an operculum, terrestrial gastropod mollusks in the family Pomatiidae.

Species 
Species within the genus Chondrothyra include:
Chondrothyra affinis (Torre & Bartsch, 1938)
Chondrothyra atristoma Torre & Bartsch, 1938
Chondrothyra barbouri (Torre & Bartsch, 1938)
Chondrothyra cerina (Torre & Bartsch, 1938)
Chondrothyra crassa Torre & Bartsch, 1938
Chondrothyra cumbrensis Torre & Bartsch, 1938
Chondrothyra detectabilis (Torre & Bartsch, 1938)
Chondrothyra egregia (Gundlach in Pfeiffer, 1856)
Chondrothyra foveata (Gundlach in Pfeiffer, 1863)
Chondrothyra gundlachi (Arango, 1862)
Chondrothyra impresa (Torre & Bartsch, 1938)
Chondrothyra incrassata (Wright in Pfeiffer, 1862)
Chondrothyra natensoni Torre & Bartsch, 1938
Chondrothyra parilis (Torre & Bartsch, 1938)
Chondrothyra percrassa (Wright in Pfeiffer, 1864)
Chondrothyra reticulata (Torre & Bartsch, 1938)
Chondrothyra rutila Torre & Bartsch, 1938
Chondrothyra shuttleworthi (Pfeiffer, 1851)
Chondrothyra subegregia Torre & Bartsch, 1938
Chondrothyra tenebrata (Torre & Bartsch, 1938)
 Chondrothyra tenebrosa (P.M.A. Morelet, 1849) 
Chondrothyra tosta Torre & Bartsch, 1938
Chondrothyra uniplicata Torre & Bartsch, 1938
Chondrothyra wrighti Torre & Bartsch, 1938

References 

Pomatiidae